Kolo is a UNESCO List of Intagible Cultural Heritage inscribed South Slavic circle dance, found under this name in Bosnia and Herzegovina, Croatia and Serbia.

History
According to Wilkes (1995), the kolo has an Illyrian origin, as the dance seems to resemble dances depicted on funeral monuments of the Roman era.

Description 
The circle dance is usually performed amongst groups of at least three people and up to several dozen people. Dancers hold each other's hands or each other's waists. They form a circle, a single chain or multiple parallel lines.

Kolo requires almost no movement above the waist. The basic steps are easy to learn. Experienced dancers demonstrate virtuosity by adding different ornamental elements, such as syncopated steps. Each region has at least one unique kolo. It is difficult to master the dance and even most experienced dancers cannot master all of them.

Kolo is performed at weddings, social, cultural, and religious ceremonies. Some dances require both men and women to dance together, others require only the men or only the women.

Music 
The music is generally fast-paced. The dance was used by Antonín Dvořák in his Slavonic Dances – the Serbian kolo is the seventh dance from opus 72.

Traditional dance costume 
Traditional dance costumes vary from region to region. Bordering regions are mostly more similar to each other.

Various kolos are performed at social ceremonies. Often traditional clothing, which is unique to a region, is worn. The most common kolo is the narodno kolo or drmeš; a standard step followed by accordion music.

Other South Slavic circle dances

Elsewhere in South Slavic countries, there is horo in Bulgaria and oro in North Macedonia and Montenegro.

See also

Armenian dance
Assyrian folk dance
Circle dance
Croatian dances
Dabke
Faroese dance
Greek dances
Hora (dance), an equivalent of the kolo
Khorovod, an Eastern European circle dance
Kurdish dance
Serbian dances
Turkish dance

References

External links
 Music and video of the basic Kolo
 Kolo, traditional folk dance on the Unesco YouTube channel

Bosnian dances
Croatian folk dances
Serbian folk dances
European folk dances
Dance forms in classical music
Circle dances